"Raph" was the racing pseudonym of Comte George Raphaël Béthenod de Montbressieux (February 8, 1910 – June 16, 1994), a French-Argentine racing driver. He was sometimes listed using his mother's name, "de las Casas".

Raph was to be entered in the 1946 Indianapolis 500, but did not arrive.

References

1910 births
1994 deaths
French racing drivers
Argentine people of French descent
24 Hours of Le Mans drivers
European Championship drivers